Vågsfjorden is a fjord in the southern part of Troms og Finnmark county in Norway. The fjord is located between Norway's two largest islands, Hinnøya to the south and Senja to the north.  The fjord connects to the Andfjorden and the Tranøyfjorden to the north, and to the Astafjorden and Tjeldsundet to the south.  The smaller islands of Grytøya and Sandsøya lie on the western side of the fjord and the islands of Andørja and Rolla lie along the eastern side of the fjord.

The town of Harstad, on the fjord's western shore, is popularly known as Vågsfjordens perle.

References

Fjords of Troms og Finnmark
Harstad
Dyrøy
Ibestad
Tjeldsund
Senja